Línea Aérea EcoJet S.A. (stylized as ecojet) is a Bolivian domestic airline headquartered on the grounds of Jorge Wilstermann International Airport in the city of Cochabamba. It started scheduled passenger operations on November 24, 2013, with two 93-seat Avro RJ85 aircraft. The airline links its home city of Cochabamba, strategically located in the center of the country, with 9 major domestic destinations, reaching all the main centers of population. Along with Amaszonas, ecojet is a private airline that competes with state-owned airline Boliviana de Aviación in the Bolivian domestic market.

History
Ecojet was established on May 21, 2013, and started operations with an inaugural flight linking Cochabamba with Sucre using an Avro RJ85.

As of January 2018, the airline's fleet has increased to four aircraft.

Destinations
The airline flies to nine destinations.

Fleet

Current fleet

The EcoJet fleet consists of the following aircraft (as of May 2021):

Former fleet
EcoJet formerly operated the following aircraft:

References

External links

Airlines of Bolivia
Airlines established in 2013
Bolivian companies established in 2013
Cochabamba